Uroconger is a genus of eels in the family Congridae. It currently contains the following species:

 Uroconger drachi (Blache & Bauchot, 1976)
 Uroconger erythraeus Castle, 1982
 Uroconger lepturus (J. Richardson, 1845) (Slender conger)
 Uroconger syringinus Ginsburg, 1954 (Threadtail conger)

References

 

Congridae